Bora Bora Island is a  island in the Bora Bora Islands Group, within the Society Islands of French Polynesia. It is the main island of the commune of the same name. Together with its surrounding islands of Tapu, Ahuna, Tevairoa, Tane, Mute, Tufari, Tehotu, Pitiaau, Sofitel, Toopua, and Toopuaiti, it forms the group of Bora Bora.

See also 

 List of volcanoes in French Polynesia
 List of reduplicated place names

References

External links

Island of Bora Bora Website
 Bora Bora from space (2598 × 3071, 9.5 MB)

 
Islands of the Society Islands
Volcanoes of French Polynesia